József Salim (15 May 1967 – April 2022) was a Hungarian taekwondo practitioner. He competed at the 1992 Summer Olympics and 2000 Summer Olympics.

References

1967 births
2022 deaths
Olympic taekwondo practitioners of Hungary
Taekwondo practitioners at the 1992 Summer Olympics
Taekwondo practitioners at the 2000 Summer Olympics
Sportspeople from Budapest